Switzerland competed at the 2019 World Beach Games in Doha, Qatar, from 12 to 16 October 2019.  The Swiss team consisted of 15 athletes, 13 men and 2 women, across three sports.

Medalists

Competitors

| width=78% align=left valign=top |
The following is the list of number of competitors in the Games:

Beach soccer

Summary

Men's tournament

Switzerland men's beach soccer team qualified for the Olympics by reaching the fourth place at the 2019 UEFA Qualifying Tournament.

Team roster
The following is the Swiss squad in the men's beach soccer tournament of the 2019 World Beach Games.

Head coach: Angelo Schirinzi

Group play

Bouldering

Petra Klingler

Skateboarding
Greg Ruhoff

Waterskiing
Rea Jörger

References

External links 
 Swiss Olympic Team – 2019 World Beach Games Coverage 

World Beach Games
Nations at the 2019 World Beach Games